E.P.S -Eiko PRIMARY SELECTION- is the first greatest hits album released by Eiko Shimamiya and the third album overall. It is also the first album released after her retirement from I've Sound in April 2011. This album features two new songs ("River" and "Inner Child") and a new remix version of the song, "Dreamer".

Track listing

Higurashi no Naku Koro ni (ひぐらしのなく頃に)
Composition: Tomoyuki Nakazawa
Arrangement: Tomoyuki Nakazawa, Kazuya Takase
Lyrics: Eiko Shimamiya
Super Scription of Data
Composition/Arrangement: Kazuya Takase
Lyrics: Eiko Shimamiya
VANILLA
Composition/Lyrics: Eiko Shimamiya
Arrangement: Kazuya Takase
Taiyou (太陽)
Composition/Lyrics: Eiko Shimamiya
Arrangement: SORMA No. 1
Chikai (誓い)
Composition: Tomoyuki Nakazawa
Arrangement: Tomoyuki Nakazawa, Takeshi Ozaki
Lyrics: Eiko Shimamiya
Hikari Nadeshiko (ひかりなでしこ)
Composition/Lyrics: Eiko Shimamiya
Arrangement: Toshiaki Nishioka, Seiichi Kyouda
Naraku no Hana (奈落の花?)
Composition: Tomoyuki Nakazawa
Arrangement: Tomoyuki Nakazawa, Takeshi Ozaki
Lyrics: Eiko Shimamiya
Dreamer -2011 remix-
Composition/Lyrics: Kazuya Takase
Arrangement: SORMA No. 1
Suna no Shiro -The Castle of Sand- (砂の城 -The Castle of Sand-)
Composition/Arrangement: Kazuya Takase
Lyrics: Tomo Kataoka (translated by Rino Egami)
Wheel of Fortune (運命の輪)
Composition/Arrangement: Kazuya Takase
Lyrics: Eiko Shimamiya
Scarabe no Inori -brown sugar style (スカラベの祈り -brown sugar style-)
Composition/Lyrics: Eiko Shimamiya
Arrangement: Kazuya Takase
River
Composition/Lyrics: Eiko Shimamiya
Arrangement: Tomoyuki Nakazawa, Yukiko Sakai
Inner Child
Composition/Lyrics: Eiko Shimamiya
Arrangement: SORMA No. 1, Kazuya Takase

References

Eiko Shimamiya albums
2011 greatest hits albums